Sojourner Truth is a public artwork by Canadian sculptor Artis Lane, located in Emancipation Hall at the United States Capitol Visitor Center in Washington, D.C. It was the first statue honoring an African-American woman in the U.S. Capitol building.

Description
The over-life-size bust of Sojourner Truth shows her in a cap and shawl similar to those in which she was often photographed. She is depicted with a smile suggesting confidence and determination. The sculpture was cast in bronze.

History

The sculpture was unveiled on April 28, 2009, in Emancipation Hall in the Capitol Visitor Center. It was the first sculpture of an African-American woman to be on display in the Capitol.  First Lady Michelle Obama, Speaker of the House Nancy Pelosi, Secretary of State Hillary Clinton, and Representative Sheila Jackson Lee were among those who offered remarks at the unveiling. Representative Lee introduced the bill, House Congressional Resolution 86, that led to the establishment of a statue to Truth in the Capitol. The National Congress of Black Women was a major contributor; they raised funds over many years to underwrite the bust.

See also

Artworks commemorating African Americans in Washington, D.C.
List of public art in Washington, D.C.

References

2009 establishments in Washington, D.C.
2009 sculptures
Black people in art
Bronze sculptures in Washington, D.C.
Busts in Washington, D.C.
Monuments and memorials in Washington, D.C.
Monuments and memorials to women
Sculptures of African Americans
Sculptures of women in Washington, D.C.
Sojourner Truth
United States Capitol statues